The DSB Class EA was the first electric locomotive in Denmark, introduced in 1984. Twenty-two were built for DSB, about half were acquired by Deutsche Bahn in 2001 when it took over the freight business of DSB.

Between 2007 and 2010 some began freight services in Bulgaria, as of 2017 only five units remain with DSB. The units were withdrawn in December 2020.

Background, design and construction
The first stretch of railway in Denmark was electrified in March 1986; DSB needed an electric locomotive that could be used as a combined freight/passenger unit. The locomotive was based on the German Class 120. The customisation included a re-designed body (adapted to DSB's new locomotive design first used on the Class ME), and adaption to the Danish overhead wire voltage (25 kV 50 Hz, as opposed to the 15 kV  Hz voltage used in Germany and other Scandinavian countries).

The locomotives were manufactured by a consortium of companies led by BBC, ABB, Siemens  Henschel, Thyssen-Henschel, EB Strømmen and ABB Scandia. The locomotives can work in push pull mode and in multiple.

The bodies of the first two locomotives were manufactured by Henschel in Germany, the remaining units by Scandia.

Locomotive history
Initially the locomotives worked on passenger trains in Zealand, after the opening of the Great Belt Fixed Link in 1997 the locomotives were used on services on Funen and Jutland. After the introduction of the IR4 trains the locomotives were mostly used on passenger services.

In 2001 the freight arm of DSB (DSB Gods) was acquired by Railion and ten locomotives, numbers 3011 to 3019 and 3021 became the property of Railion Denmark.

In 2007, five locomotives were sold to private Bulgarian gas firm Bulmarket for use on its liquified gas trains.

In 2010 DB Schenker Bulgaria began running trains in Bulgaria, using ex DSB EA locomotives it had inherited from Railion; the locomotives received class number 86 whilst retaining the original locomotive number.

DSB EA 3004 and 3010 was withdrawn from service in May 2020 due to bad condition. DSB then had three EAs left 3007, 3020 and 3022. 3007 was only for reserve for 3020 and 3022 which were in better condition. The EA locos only drove on specific train departures Monday to Friday. They were not in service at weekends. DSB had ordered new locomotives, DSB EB (Siemens Vectron) to replace the EA and the first 3 arrived in mid-September 2020. After the EB had gone through test runs, they took over one the EA runs which meant the EA-locos only had one run Monday to Friday. The EA run had four departures two in the morning and two in the afternoon between Østerport - København H (Copenhagen C) - Ringsted. Friday the 11th December 17:57 o´clock (5:57pm) the last EA passenger-towed train (Towed by EA 3020) departed from Ringsted station and arrived at Østerport at 18:58 o´clock (6:58pm). After the arrival the locomotive drove to the workshop for the day. Saturday the 12th December EA 3020 and EA 3022 drove a test run with a wagon from the workshop to Korsør via Høje Taastrup and back to the workshop via the new highspeed track over Køge Nord (Køge North), It was the first, only and last time the EA had driven on the new highspeed track by itself. After the test run, they were withdrawn from service and put for sale with 3007 and 3010.

In February 2021 the last four EA-locos were sold to Bulmarket, Bulgaria to join the rest of the EA series except of EA 3004 which is stored in Denmark Railway Museum

List of locomotives
The 22 class EA locomotives are named after scientists, engineers and railway people as follows:

See also
 List of DSB locomotives and multiple units
 DSB Class ME, similar externally designed contemporary diesel electric locomotive

References

External links

Images : DB Schenker rolling stock in Bulgaria, www.railfaneurope.net
Video : BULMARKET freight train, ex DSB EA class with tanker train, www.youtube.com

Bo′Bo′ locomotives
EA 3001
Railway locomotives introduced in 1984
Electric locomotives of Denmark
Standard gauge locomotives of Denmark
Standard gauge locomotives of Bulgaria
Standard gauge locomotives of Romania